Bangladesh School Muscat is a school for Bangladeshi children in Oman. The institute follows the British Curriculum.

History
The school was established on 3 September 1996 for students of all background and nationality but mainly Bangladeshi children under the sponsorship of the Embassy of Bangladesh to  the Sultanate of Oman with the approval of the Ministry of Education, Oman.

Activities
 In March 2014, the school celebrated the 43rd National Day anniversary of the independence of Oman.
 Two years later, the school marked the 45th anniversary by organising a cultural programme.
 In February 2014, the school held an Annual Science Fair and Exhibition.

Principal
Since 10 August 2022, the principal has been Miss Nasrin

References

International schools in Oman
Bangladeshi international schools
Educational institutions established in 1996
1996 establishments in Oman